Qayesh QurShaq (also Romanized as Qayesh Qūr Shāq and Qāyesh QūrShāq) is a village in Abbas-e Sharqi Rural District, Tekmeh Dash District, Bostanabad County, East Azerbaijan Province, Iran. At the 2006 census, its population was 100, in 35 families. More detail information about culture people of Qayesh Qurshaq can be found in Heydar Babaya Salam  of Mohammad Hossein Shahriar, a famous Iranian Azerbaijani  poet, who spent early years of his life in Qayesh Qurshaq. And the name of Shahryar poetical work, coming from the name of the mountain "Heydar Baba" which is shown in this page photo. please check the weather of this village in the following link:

https://www.theweathernetwork.com/ir/36-hour-weather-forecast/azarbayjan-e-sharqi/qayesh-qurshaq

References 

Populated places in Bostanabad County